Helicos BioSciences Corporation was a publicly traded life science company headquartered in Cambridge, Massachusetts focused on genetic analysis technologies for the research, drug discovery and diagnostic markets. The firm's Helicos Genetic Analysis Platform was the first DNA-sequencing instrument to operate by imaging individual DNA molecules. In May 2010, the company announced a 50% layoff and a re-focusing on molecular diagnostics. After long financial troubles, in November 2010, Helicos was delisted from NASDAQ.

Helicos was co-founded in 2003 by life science entrepreneur Stanley Lapidus, Stephen Quake, and Noubar Afeyan with investments from Atlas Venture, Flagship Ventures, Highland Capital Partners, MPM Capital, and Versant Ventures.

Helicos's technology images the extension of individual DNA molecules using a defined primer and individual fluorescently labeled nucleotides, which contain a "Virtual Terminator" preventing incorporation of multiple nucleotides per cycle. The "Virtual Terminator" technology was developed by Dr. Suhaib Siddiqi, while at Helicos Biosciences.

In the August 2009 issue of Nature Biotechnology, Dr. Stephen Quake, a professor of bioengineering at Stanford University and a co-founder of Helicos BioSciences, sequenced his own genome, using Single Molecule Sequencing for under $50,000 in reagents.

On November 15, 2012, Helicos BioSciences filed for Chapter 11 bankruptcy.

The patents that Helicos had licensed from Cal Tech (where Quake was when he made the underlying inventions) were subsequently licensed to Direct Genomics, founded by Jiankui He, a former post-doc in Quake's lab who gained notoriety in November 2018 when he created the first germline genome-edited babies.

See also
Helicos single molecule fluorescent sequencing
Pharmacogenomics
Genetic counseling
Genomics

References

External links 
 Helicos BioSciences Corp. firm website (Now defunct after Bankruptcy)

Biotechnology companies of the United States
Genomics companies
2003 establishments in Massachusetts
Biotechnology companies established in 2003
Life science companies based in Massachusetts
Companies based in Cambridge, Massachusetts
Companies that filed for Chapter 11 bankruptcy in 2012